Thomas Hobbs (died 1509) was a Dean of Windsor from 1507 to 1509.

Career

He was appointed:
King’s Clerk and Chaplain 1494–1509
Warden of All Souls College, Oxford 1499
Northern Proctor 1491–1492
Dean of St Stephen's Westminster 1504
Prebendary of Oxgate in St Paul's until 1509

He was appointed to the eighth stall in St George's Chapel, Windsor Castle in 1502 and held the canonry until 1507, when he was appointed Dean of Windsor, and he held this until he died.

Notes 

1509 deaths
Canons of Windsor
Deans of Windsor
Wardens of All Souls College, Oxford
Deans of St Stephen's Chapel, Westminster
Year of birth unknown